Balsam Grove is an unincorporated community located in Transylvania County, North Carolina within Pisgah National Forest and Nantahala National Forest.

The Pisgah Astronomical Research Institute is located in Balsam Grove.

References

Unincorporated communities in Transylvania County, North Carolina
Unincorporated communities in North Carolina